City Sonic is a documentary series about Toronto-based musicians and the places that influenced their music. The first five City Sonic films were previewed at Toronto's 2009 North by North East Music and Film Festival, and subsequently 10 films screened at Toronto International Film Festival and the 2010 Hot Docs Canadian International Documentary Festival .

Films

City Sonic is a series of 20 short film films about places where music happens. Directed by Canadian filmmakers and co-produced by White Pine Pictures and Kensington Communications, each City Sonic film features one artist and one Toronto location that influenced them and their work. It was produced as 4 half hours for broadcast and was a leader in the development of its locative functionality through its smart phone mobile app. 

Cancer Bats at Adrift Clubhouse
Care Failure (Die Mannequin) at 102.1 The Edge
Barenaked Ladies at Ultrasound Showbar
Brian Borcherdt (Holy Fuck) at Sneaky Dee's
Danko Jones at Maple Leaf Gardens
Jason Collett in Kensington Market
Justin Rutledge and Bazil Donovan (Blue Rodeo) at The Cameron House
Damian Abraham (Fucked Up) at Rotate This
D-Sisive at Planet Mars
Serena Ryder at the Dakota Tavern
Geddy Lee (Rush) at Massey Hall
Tony Dekker (Great Lake Swimmers) at Spadina Subway Station
Laura Barrett with Martin Tielli at the Art Gallery of Ontario
Woodhands at the Don Valley Brick Works
Sarah Slean at The Rivoli
Lioness at the Masonic Temple
Divine Brown at The Rex Hotel
Brendan Canning (Broken Social Scene) at the Drake Hotel
Colin Munroe at the Revival Bar
Sebastien Grainger (Death From Above 1979) at the El Mocambo

Directors
 
Anita Doron
Peter Lynch
Robert Lang
Bruce McDonald
Charles Officer
Rob Pilichowski
George Vale

References

External links
 
 City Sonic Blog
 City Sonic on Facebook
 City Sonic YouTube Channel
 City Sonic on MySpace
 City Sonic on Twitter

Music of Toronto
2000s Canadian documentary television series
Documentary web series
2000s Canadian music television series
Documentary films about Toronto
Canadian non-fiction web series